Major R. Johnson Finley (born March 10, 1984), professionally known by his stage name Major (stylized: MAJOR.), is a Grammy Nominated American pop soul musician, singer-songwriter, vocal producer, and stage performance coach.

Early life 
Born in Denton, Texas and raised in Houston, Texas, in a blended-family household of 10 siblings (13 total), MAJOR. began making music at a young age and performed in various musical venues in his hometown and abroad throughout his childhood. He graduated from the High School for the Performing and Visual Arts, received intensive classical training from Professor Steve Smith of The Juilliard School and Houston Grand Opera High School Voice Studio. He then attended the Berklee College of Music, serving as student body president, and after graduating, moved to Los Angeles to pursue an entertainment career.

Career 
After parting ways with Malibu-based Star Club Entertainment where he generated viral success via YouTube, MAJOR. then entered a production/recording relationship with B.O.E. Music Group in partnership with UK producer Harmony Samuels in early 2014. MAJOR. attributes finding his truest sound to his musical partnership with Samuels.

MAJOR. is highly regarded for his powerful live show experiences including 2 sold-out shows at the historic Troubadour (Santa Monica), World Arts (Culver City), Hotel Cafe (Hollywood), Barclays Center (Brooklyn).

MAJOR. has released an EP (i am MAJOR.) which features 2 singles and 2 music videos: "Why I Love You" and "Keep On", with over 126 million combined views on YouTube. Stevie Wonder described "Why I Love You" as "the wedding song of the year". The song has also reached Top 5 on the Adult R&B Billboard charts and certified Platinum by RIAA.

Freelance journalist, Billy Johnson, Jr., credited MAJOR. as being the "Hope-Dealer" of mainstream music in a Yahoo! Music article feature published in 2015.

MAJOR.'s debut album, Even More, was released on September 7, 2018.

Major is currently starring as "Rashad" on Fox TV musical drama Star.

Filmography

References 

Living people
African-American musicians
1984 births
People from Denton, Texas
American soul musicians
Musicians from Houston
21st-century African-American people
20th-century African-American people